Sconcerto is an album by Italian singer Mina, issued in 2001.

The album is an homage to the songs of Grammy Award-winning Italian singer, songwriter, and composer Domenico Modugno.

As the (double meaning) title of the album suggests, the songs are mostly sung with the backing of an orchestra or jazz combo and do not include the famous monologues heard at the beginning of several Modugno hits.

Track listing 

 Tu si' 'na cosa grande – 4:54
 Pasqualino marajà – 4:13
 Resta cu'mme – 5:04
 Amara terra mia – 4:19
 Notte di luna calante – 5:26
 La donna riccia – 3:09
 Dio, come ti amo! – 5:39
 Strada 'nfosa – 4:41
 Come hai fatto – 4:42
 La lontananza – 6:19
 Nel blu, dipinto di blu (Volare) – 1:50

Mina (Italian singer) live albums
2001 live albums